Nemanja Obrić (Serbian Cyrillic: Немања Обрић; born April 15, 1984) is a Serbian football midfielder. He previously played in Indonesia with Pelita Bandung Raya on Indonesia Super League. Before moving to Indonesia, he had played in several clubs in Serbia, Hungary, and Saudi Arabia. He also had his youth career as a footballer in Red Star Belgrade even though he never played a match in his senior career with the club.

External links
 Profile at Srbijafudbal
 Profile at Ligaindonesia

1984 births
Living people
Sportspeople from Sombor
Serbian footballers
FK Spartak Subotica players
FK Mladost Apatin players
Kaposvári Rákóczi FC players
Expatriate footballers in Hungary
Serbian expatriate sportspeople in Indonesia
Expatriate footballers in Indonesia
Liga 1 (Indonesia) players
Red Star Belgrade footballers
Association football midfielders
Al-Hazem F.C. players
Pelita Bandung Raya players
Saudi Professional League players